Pieter Gysel (born 18 December 1980 in Leuven, Flemish Brabant, Belgium) is a Belgian short track speed skater.

External links
 
 

1980 births
Living people
Belgian male short track speed skaters
Olympic short track speed skaters of Belgium
Short track speed skaters at the 2002 Winter Olympics
Short track speed skaters at the 2006 Winter Olympics
Short track speed skaters at the 2010 Winter Olympics
Sportspeople from Leuven